Void is a 2013 Lebanese drama film written by Georges Khabbaz and directed by seven different directors, who are all graduates from Notre Dame University. The film was nominated as the Lebanese entry for the Best Foreign Language Film at the 88th Academy Awards but it was not selected.

Cast
 Carol Abboud
 Rodrigue Sleiman
 Latifeh Moultaka
 Antoine Moultaka
 Takla Chamoun
 Liliane Nemri
 Ziad Soueiby
 Diamand Bou Abboud
 Elie Metri
 Carmen Lebbos
 Julian Farhat
 Nada Abou Farhat
 Talal El-Jordi 
 Lara Khabbaz

See also
 List of submissions to the 88th Academy Awards for Best Foreign Language Film
 List of Lebanese submissions for the Academy Award for Best Foreign Language Film

References

External links
 

2013 films
2013 drama films
2010s Arabic-language films
Lebanese drama films